Chasson Randle (born February 5, 1993) is an American professional basketball player for the Oklahoma City Blue of the NBA G League. He played college basketball for the Stanford Cardinal. As a senior in 2014–15, he was considered one of the top point guards in the country. Born in Rock Island, Illinois, Randle played basketball for Rock Island High School.

High school career
Randle was a highly recruited player out of Rock Island High School. He had led his school to its first Illinois state title, and shared Illinois Mr. Basketball honors with East Aurora's Ryan Boatright in 2011. He had his best season as a senior recording 22.3 points per game and 7.7 rebounds per game. Randle is Rock Island's all-time leader in scoring with 2,159 points and rebounding with 773 boards. He was named in ESPN 100 top recruits for 2011 receiving a grading of 94, while ranking 60th nationally and 10th in the point guard position. Scout.com ranked him 61st nationally and 12th in the point guard position, while Rivals.com ranked him 78th nationally and 20th at shooting guard. He was also selected to the 2008, 2009 and 2010 All-Tournament teams at the prestigious State Farm Holiday Classic held in Bloomington-Normal, IL.

College career

Randle ultimately chose to play college basketball with Stanford over Illinois and Purdue due to head coach Johnny Dawkins' personal attention during the recruiting process. In his freshman season, Randle averaged 13.8 points per game, was named to the Pac-12 All-Freshman team, and helped lead Stanford to the 2012 National Invitation Tournament title. As a sophomore, Randle averaged 13.6 points and 2.7 assists per game.

Prior to his junior season, Randle was moved to the point guard position, in large part due to an injury to former starter Aaron Bright. He responded well to the move, averaging 18.8 points per game, earning first-team All-Pac-12 Conference and leading Stanford to the Sweet 16 of the 2014 NCAA tournament.

Prior to his senior season, Randle was named to the watch lists for the John R. Wooden and Naismith College Player of the Year awards for national player of the year and the Bob Cousy Award for top college point guard in the country. Randle is also on the mid-season list for 25 Wooden Award finalists.  On January 22, 2015, Randle scored his 2,000th career point in a home loss to Arizona. With the mark he became the third player in program history to reach this milestone. At season's end, he was voted first-team All-Pac-12 for the second straight season. Randle was the Pac-12 scholar-athlete of the year in the 2014-15 season. He posted a game-high 25 points in the 2015 NIT Final versus Miami (FL) and earned the tournament's Most Outstanding Player award. Randle, at the time of his graduation, was Stanford's all-time leading scorer with 2,375 points.

Professional career

Nymburk (2015–2016)
After going undrafted in the 2015 NBA draft, Randle joined the Golden State Warriors for the 2015 NBA Summer League. On July 23, 2015, Randle signed with ČEZ Nymburk of the Czech Republic's National Basketball League (NBL). In 20 NBL games, he averaged 15.3 points, 2.4 rebounds, 2.3 assists and 1.6 steals per game. He helped Nymburk win the 2015–16 NBL championship.

Westchester Knicks (2016–2017)
In July 2016, Randle joined the New York Knicks for the 2016 NBA Summer League. On August 4, 2016, he signed with the Knicks, but was later waived on October 21, 2016, after appearing in three preseason games. On October 31, 2016, he was acquired by the Westchester Knicks of the NBA Development League as an affiliate player of New York. In 19 games with the Knicks, he averaged 21 points, four rebounds, three assists and one steal in 32 minutes while shooting 40% from three-point range.

Philadelphia 76ers (2017)
On January 10, 2017, Randle signed a 10-day contract with the Philadelphia 76ers. Four days later, he made his NBA debut in a 109–93 loss to the Washington Wizards, recording three points and one steal in six minutes off the bench. In his second game for the 76ers on January 16, he scored 10 points in a 113–104 win over the Milwaukee Bucks. He signed a second 10-day contract with the 76ers on January 20, and then a three-year deal on January 30. On February 10, he was assigned to the Delaware 87ers for a stint in the D-League. He was recalled by the 76ers the following day. On February 23, he was waived by the 76ers; the team had to clear up a spot on their 15-man roster in order for them to make a trade. Randle averaged 5.3 points in 9.3 minutes in eight appearances for the 76ers.

Real Madrid (2017–2018)
On February 27, 2017, Randle signed with the New York Knicks. Following the Carmelo Anthony trade, he was waived on September 25, 2017.

On October 7, 2017, Randle signed a one-year deal with the Real Madrid. In May 2018, Real Madrid won the 2017–18 EuroLeague championship, after defeating Fenerbahçe Doğuş in the final game with 85–80. Over 23 EuroLeague games, Randle averaged 2.6 points and 1 rebound per game.

Washington Wizards / Capital City Go-Go (2018–2019) 
On September 20, 2018, Randle signed with the Washington Wizards for training camp. He was waived by the Wizards on October 14, 2018. He was then added to the training camp roster of the Wizards’ G League affiliate, the Capital City Go-Go. The Wizards re-signed Randle on October 30. He was assigned to the Go-Go for their season opener. Randle was recalled to the Wizards on November 6, 2018, after scoring 37 in the season opener for the Go-Go. On November 12, 2018, the Washington Wizards announced that they had waived Randle via their Twitter account.

On November 15, 2018, the Go-Go announced that they had reacquired Randle.

After clearing a roster spot by trading Austin Rivers and Kelly Oubre Jr., the Wizards re-signed Randle on December 18, 2018.

Tianjin Pioneers (2019–2020)
On August 14, 2019, Randle signed a contract with the Tianjin Pioneers. On December 24, 2019, Randle had a career-high 44 points against the Shandong Heroes in a loss. Over 24 CBA games, Randle averaged 24.8 points, 3.5 rebounds and 4 assists per game.

Golden State Warriors (2020)
On March 3, 2020, the Golden State Warriors announced that they had signed Randle to a 10-day contract. However, the NBA coronavirus shutdown occurred while still on contract. Thus, he became a free agent before the resume of the season.

Oklahoma City Blue (2021)
On January 28, 2021, Randle was included in roster of the Oklahoma City Blue and making his debut on February 11, 2021, with eighteen points, four rebounds and two assists.

Orlando Magic (2021)
On February 15, 2021, the Orlando Magic announced that they had signed Randle to a two-way contract.

On September 26, 2021, Randle was signed by the Phoenix Suns, but was waived on October 16.

New Zealand Breakers (2021–2022)
On December 15, 2021, Randle signed with the New Zealand Breakers of the Australian National Basketball League (NBL) as an injury replacement for Peyton Siva. He appeared in just one game – a loss against the Tasmania JackJumpers on December 26 – before Siva returned to action on January 9, 2022, rendering Randle unable to play. Randle remained with the team, and on February 10, he was upgraded to a full roster spot following the release of Jeremiah Martin. In 17 games during the 2021–22 NBL season, he averaged 7.76 points and 1.35 rebounds per game.

Grand Rapids Gold (2022–2023)
On November 4, 2022, Randle was named to the opening night roster for the Grand Rapids Gold.

Return to the Blue (2023–present)
On February 11, 2023, Randle was reacquired by the Oklahoma City Blue.

Personal life
The son of Willie and Gwen Randle, he has three sisters: Lakisha, Lamera and Khaliyah.

Career statistics

NBA

Regular season

|-
| style="text-align:left;"|
| style="text-align:left;"|Philadelphia
| 8 || 0 || 9.3 || .462 || .400 || 1.000 || .6 || .8 || .4 || .1 || 5.3
|-
| style="text-align:left;"|
| style="text-align:left;"|New York
| 18 || 0 || 12.5 || .389 || .312 || .935 || 1.7 || 1.6 || .3 || .1 || 5.3
|-
| style="text-align:left;"|
| style="text-align:left;"|Washington
| 49 || 2 || 15.2 || .419 || .400 || .694 || 1.1 || 2.0 || .5 || .1 || 5.5
|-
| style="text-align:left;"|
| style="text-align:left;"|Golden State
| 3 || 0 || 13.3 || .000 || .000 || .833 || .7 || 1.7 || .7 || .0 || 1.7
|-
| style="text-align:left;"|
| style="text-align:left;"|Orlando
| 41 || 5 || 20.4 || .388 || .338 || .792 || 2.0 || 1.8 || .5 || .1 || 6.5
|- class="sortbottom"
| style="text-align:center;" colspan="2"|Career
| 119 || 7 || 16.1 || .401 || .361 || .799 || 1.4 || 1.8 || .5 || .1 || 5.7

EuroLeague

|-
| style="text-align:left; background:#afe6ba;"|2017–18
| style="text-align:left;"| Real Madrid
| 23 || 0 || 7.6 || .440 || .450 || .750 || .5 || 1.0 || .2 || .0 || 2.6 || 1.7
|- class="sortbottom"
| style="text-align:center;" colspan="2"|Career
| 23 || 0 || 7.6 || .440 || .450 || .750 || .5 || 1.0 || .2 || .0 || 2.6 || 1.7

CBA

|-
| style="text-align:left; "|2019–20
| style="text-align:left;"|Tianjin
| style="text-align:left;"|CBA
| 24 || 30.9 || .412 || .366 || .866 || 3.5 || 4.0 || 1.6 || .2 || 24.8
|- class="sortbottom"
| style="text-align:center;" colspan="3"|Career
| 24 || 30.9 || .412 || .366 || .866 || 3.5 || 4.0 || 1.6 || .2 || 24.8

College

|-
| style="text-align:left;"|2011–12
| style="text-align:left;"|Stanford
| 37 || 36 || 30.5 || .439 || .438 || .761 || 3.2 || 2.1 || 1.1 || .1 || 13.8
|-
| style="text-align:left;"|2012–13
| style="text-align:left;"|Stanford
| 34 || 33 || 31.0 || .399 || .359 || .784 || 2.9 || 2.6 || 1.1 || .1 || 13.6
|-
| style="text-align:left;"|2013–14
| style="text-align:left;"|Stanford
| 36 || 36 || 35.1 || .474 || .389 || .767 || 3.6 || 2.1 || 1.0 || .1 || 18.8
|-
| style="text-align:left;"|2014–15
| style="text-align:left;"|Stanford
| 37 || 37 || 36.4 || .403 || .363 || .877 || 3.3 || 3.0 || 1.4 || .1 || 19.6'''
|- class="sortbottom"
| style="text-align:center;" colspan="2"|Career
| 144 || 142 || 33.3 || .428 || .386 || .806 || 3.3 || 2.5 || 1.2 || .1 || 16.5

References

External links

 Stanford Cardinal bio
 Chasson Randle at euroleague.net
 Chasson Randle at fiba.com
 Chasson Randle at fibaeurope.com

1993 births
Living people
American expatriate basketball people in the Czech Republic
American expatriate basketball people in Spain
American men's basketball players
Basketball Nymburk players
Basketball players from Illinois
Capital City Go-Go players
Delaware 87ers players
Golden State Warriors players
Grand Rapids Gold players
Liga ACB players
New York Knicks players
New Zealand Breakers players
Oklahoma City Blue players
Orlando Magic players
Philadelphia 76ers players
Point guards
Real Madrid Baloncesto players
Shooting guards
Sportspeople from Rock Island, Illinois
Stanford Cardinal men's basketball players
Undrafted National Basketball Association players
United States men's national basketball team players
Washington Wizards players
Westchester Knicks players